St. Vincent Ferrer High School is an American all-girls', private, Roman Catholic high school, located on the Upper East Side of the Manhattan borough of  New York City, New York. 

It is located within the Roman Catholic Archdiocese of New York.

Background

The school is sponsored by the parish of Saint Vincent Ferrer Church located at East 65th Street and Lexington Avenue. 

The first school was built in 1884 and the Dominican Sisters of Saint Mary of Springs (now The Dominican Sisters of Our Lady of the Springs of Bridgeport) teach and administer the school.

Notes and references

External links
 , the school's official website

1884 establishments in New York (state)
Educational institutions established in 1884
Dominican schools in the United States
Girls' schools in New York City
Roman Catholic secondary schools in Manhattan
Upper East Side